NGC 624 is a barred spiral galaxy in the constellation of Cetus, which is about 264 million light years from the Milky Way. It was discovered on November 28, 1785, by the German-British astronomer William Herschel.

See also 
 List of NGC objects (1–1000)

References

External links 
 

Barred spiral galaxies
0624
Cetus (constellation)
005932